Robertsville is an unincorporated community and census-designated place in western Paris Township, Stark County, Ohio, United States.  It has a post office with the ZIP code 44670.  It lies along U.S. Route 30 between East Canton and Minerva and is in the Minerva Local School District. The community is part of the Canton–Massillon Metropolitan Statistical Area.

History
A variant name was Robardsville. Robertsville was laid out in 1842 by Joseph Robard, and named for him. A post office called Robertsville has been in operation since 1862.

References

Unincorporated communities in Stark County, Ohio
Unincorporated communities in Ohio
Census-designated places in Stark County, Ohio